Alafiarou is a town and arrondissement located in the commune of Tchaourou in the Borgou Department of Benin. 

Populated places in Benin
Arrondissements of Benin